"Waterworks" is the twelfth and penultimate episode of the sixth season of Better Call Saul, the spin-off television series of Breaking Bad. It was written and directed by Vince Gilligan. The episode aired on AMC and AMC+ on August 8, 2022, before debuting online in certain territories on Netflix the following day. "Waterworks" primarily takes place after the events of Breaking Bad, exploring Kim Wexler's new life in Florida while continuing the story of Gene Takavic in Omaha, Nebraska.

"Waterworks" was met with critical acclaim, particularly for Gilligan's direction and teleplay, the cinematography, and Rhea Seehorn's performance as Kim. An estimated 1.32 million viewers saw the episode during its first broadcast on AMC.

Plot 
In 2004, in Albuquerque, New Mexico, Kim Wexler finalizes her divorce with Jimmy McGill / Saul Goodman. Outside Saul's office, Kim has a conversation with Jesse Pinkman, a friend of Saul's latest client, Emilio Koyama. Jesse notes Saul's shady advertising and asks whether he is a legitimate attorney; Kim replies that he was when she knew him. 

In 2010, Kim leads a quiet suburban lifestyle in Titusville, Florida, where she has a desk job at Palm Coast Sprinkler. While at work, she receives a call from Jimmy, under an alias, checking in on her; Kim cautions him against calling her due to his fugitive status and tells him to turn himself in. Jimmy angrily refuses, challenging her to turn herself in for her involvement in Howard Hamlin's disappearance.

Kim flies to Albuquerque and visits Cheryl, Howard's widow, to whom she gives a written confession detailing her and Jimmy's plot to character-assassinate Howard, as well as the truth about his death. Kim says she submitted the affidavit to the district attorney but notes she might not face prosecution due to the lack of physical evidence or witnesses. That night, she has an emotional breakdown while riding the bus back to the airport.
	
In Omaha, Nebraska, Gene breaks into the home of Mr. Lingk, the latest target of his identity-theft scheme, and locates his financial records and account passwords while he is unconscious. Gene lingers in the house and steals some of Lingk's wristwatches from his second-floor loft. Lingk suddenly awakens and sits on the loft stairs; Gene prepares to bludgeon Lingk with an urn containing his dog's ashes, but Lingk passes out again. Outside, Jeff panics when a police car idles behind him and crashes his taxi into a parked vehicle; the distraction allows Gene to escape while Jeff is arrested for the robbery.

Jeff calls Gene and asks him to post bail. Gene calls Marion to ask her to accompany him, explaining that Nebraska does not require a bondsman, and that having a family member present would be more compelling to the authorities. Marion, suspicious of Gene's legal knowledge, uses the computer Jeff bought for her using money from the department store heist to discover that "Gene" is Saul Goodman. When Gene arrives, he attempts to intimidate Marion into silence, but she uses her Life Alert button to call the police, forcing him to flee.

Production 
"Waterworks" was written and directed by Breaking Bad and Better Call Saul creator Vince Gilligan. This is Gilligan's only solo writing credit for the series, and the first television episode he wrote by himself since "Felina", the series finale for Breaking Bad. Gilligan rejoined the Better Call Saul writers' room in the sixth season, having left early in the third season and ceding showrunning duties to series co-creator Peter Gould.

Bob Odenkirk and Rhea Seehorn are the only actors listed in the starring credits. Seehorn had been absent from the series since "Fun and Games" three episodes prior. The episode answered the long-posed question from fans and critics alike of Kim Wexler's fate and whereabouts after the events of Breaking Bad. Gilligan mentioned that, over the years, several people had asked if Kim was deceased in this timeline. While this was a possibility, the writing staff never considered killing off the character. Seehorn interpreted that "a part of her has died" and her overall character as being a "shell of a person". She had discussed Kim's character with Gould and Gilligan, noting that while there was "nothing wrong with her life, quote unquote", her life was considered "tragic" as "It is only because we know what she could have been, and her potential and what she wanted, that it is so tragic to have her not practicing law, to have her not be using her brain to her full potential or her skill set". In her phone call with Gene, Seehorn interpreted that Kim had asked Gene to turn himself in "out of love that she’s saying this can’t be much of a life, like, turn yourself in". She also added that while Kim understood Gene had asked her to confess to her crimes was "defensive, reactive talk", it was also an indirect challenge to her conscience, which Seehorn believes encourages her to "take on her own conscience".

Scenes of Kim's house in Titusville, Florida, were filmed in Albuquerque, New Mexico, with digital matte paintings used to give the illusion of a tropical environment. Other scenes of Kim driving through Florida and Jimmy driving through Omaha were shot on a soundstage in non-moving vehicles. The scenes set in Omaha are predominantly black-and-white, save for when a Saul Goodman commercial in color reflects on Gene's glasses. Gould said this use of color (which was used in a similar fashion in the pilot) was a sign of Gene recalling his fondness for his time as Saul. The scene's music was reused from the first episode, and was Dave Porter's first composition for Better Call Saul. Kim's emotional breakdown was filmed on an actual rental-car bus that circled Albuquerque International Sunport, in a full take. Using four cameras for proper camera coverage on Seehorn, Gilligan only needed two takes for the scene. Gilligan's wife, Holly Rice, has a cameo as the bus rider who sits next to Kim and puts her hand on her to comfort her.

Aaron Paul again reprised his Breaking Bad role of Jesse Pinkman after appearing in the previous episode. His scene, shot months before the episode to accommodate his schedule, was filmed in dark lighting to help conceal his age. Gilligan stated the writers room expressed excitement to have Jesse share a scene with Kim and "have these two worlds collide," despite the scene not progressing the plot much farther.

Reception

Critical response 

"Waterworks" received critical acclaim. On the review aggregator Rotten Tomatoes, the episode received an approval rating of 100% based on 11 reviews, with an average rating of 9.5/10. The critical consensus said, "An arresting showcase for Rhea Seehorn, the penultimate installment of Better Call Saul wistfully surveys what came before while teeing up this saga's conclusion with agonizing tension." It received five out of five stars from Scott Tobias of Vulture, Nick Harley of Den of Geek, and Raul Velasquez of Game Rant. The A.V. Club's Kimberly Potts and IndieWire's Steve Green graded the episode with an "A" and "A-", respectively. Harley called the episode "masterful [and] full of emotionally walloping moments, black comedy, and satisfying reveals [and] among the very best Vince Gilligan-verse hours assembled." Liz Shannon Miller of Consequence said the episode was a "masterclass in making the mundane seem both important and suspenseful."

Seehorn's performance was singled out by many critics as the highlight of the episode. Harley called the performance "transcendent", while Chase Hutchinson of Collider said that "though Seehorn says little in these scenes, her physical performance is nothing short of revelatory as we journey with her through the rubble of her past." Several critics highlighted the scene where she breaks down crying on the bus. Alan Sepinwall of Rolling Stone labeled it as "the best scene Seehorn has ever played on this show." Vanity Fair's Mike Hogan described it as "a sequence that brilliantly shows off the acting prowess of Rhea Seehorn, who has been spectacular throughout this series." 

Critics also praised Gilligan's directing and writing, the cinematography, Odenkirk and Burnett's performances, the scene between Kim and Cheryl, and Kim's encounter with Jesse. TVLine named Burnett as an honorable mention for "Performer of the Week", for the week of August 13, 2022. They wrote, "Burnett's legacy as a TV icon is unquestioned, but it's nice to see she can still add to that legacy — at 89 years old! — with finely calibrated work like this." TV Guide ranked "Waterworks" the fifth best episode of the year.

Ratings 
An estimated 1.32 million viewers watched "Waterworks" during its first broadcast on AMC on August 8, 2022.

Notes

References

External links 
 "Waterworks" at AMC
 

2022 American television episodes
Better Call Saul (season 6) episodes
Black-and-white television episodes
Identity theft in popular culture
Television episodes directed by Vince Gilligan
Television episodes written by Vince Gilligan